River Grove may refer to:
 River Grove (Tampa), a neighborhood within the City of Tampa, Florida, United States
 River Grove, Illinois
 Rivergrove, Oregon, a city in Oregon, United States